Motor Square Garden, also known as East Liberty Market, is a building in Pittsburgh, Pennsylvania, USA, that is listed on the National Register of Historic Places.

Located at 5900 Baum Boulevard in the East Liberty neighborhood, it today serves as the headquarters of the Pittsburgh branch of the American Automobile Association, which owns the property. The exterior of the building features a large tin-clad, steel-framed blue dome and a yellow brick facade. The industrial interior has a large atrium with exposed steel girders and skylights above.

History

Financed by the Mellon family of Pittsburgh, the building was built from 1898 to 1900 as a city market—after one of their real estate subdivisions failed to sell enough houses—calling it East Liberty Market House. The Boston, Massachusetts architectural firm of Peabody and Stearns designed the building.  Motor Square Garden soon failed as a retail space, but in 1915 the new Pittsburgh Automobile Association bought it as a site for its auto shows. In the 1920s, it came into use as a sports venue, especially for boxing, and was used intermittently as the home court of the University of Pittsburgh's basketball team until the opening of Pitt Pavilion inside Pitt Stadium in 1925. By the 1940s it was used as a new car dealership.

In 1988, AAA bought the property.  Landmarks Design Associates of Pittsburgh redesigned it as an upscale shopping mall. The retail mall failed, but AAA expanded to occupy the building, along with a tenant, the UPMC Shadyside School of Nursing.

Gallery

References

External links

Commercial buildings on the National Register of Historic Places in Pennsylvania
Commercial buildings completed in 1900
Basketball venues in Pittsburgh
Defunct college basketball venues in the United States
Market houses
Peabody and Stearns buildings
Pittsburgh History & Landmarks Foundation Historic Landmarks
Pittsburgh Panthers basketball venues
Art Nouveau architecture in Pennsylvania
Art Nouveau retail buildings
National Register of Historic Places in Pittsburgh